Albertus Airport is a civil public-use airport located 3 miles southeast of the city of Freeport, Illinois, United States. The airport is owned by the city.

The airport has three runways. Runway 6/24 is the longest and only hard-surface runway, measuring 5504 x 100 ft (1678 x 30 m) and made of asphalt. Runway 18/36 is 2404 x 150 ft (733 x 46 m) and made of turf, while runway 13/31 is 2285 x 150 ft (696 x 46 m) and also turf.

For the 12-month period ending March 31, 2020, the airport averaged 55 aircraft operations per day, or roughly 20,075 per year, all general aviation. For the same time period, there were 48 aircraft based on the field: 31 single-engine, 10 glider, 5 multi-engine, and 2 helicopter.

Albertus Airport is home to the Northwest Illinois Airshow. The event started in 2021 during the COVID-19 pandemic and has continued since. The one-day event features aerobatic aircraft performing stunts.

References 

Airports in Illinois